A scientific enterprise is a science-based project developed by, or in cooperation with, a private entrepreneur. For example, in the Age of Exploration, leaders like Henry the Navigator founded schools of navigation, from which stemmed voyages of exploration.

Examples of enterprising scientific organizations
Each organization listed below has the ability to conduct scientific research on an extended basis, involving multiple researchers over an extended time. Generally, the research is funded not only for the science itself, but for some application which shows promise for the enterprise. But the researchers, if left to their own choices, will tend to follow their research interest, which is essential for the long-term health of their chosen field. Note that a successful scientific enterprise is not equivalent to a successful high-tech enterprise or to a successful business enterprise, but that they form an ecology, a food chain.
The Max Planck Institute, which supports fundamental research in the natural, life and social sciences, the arts and humanities
The RAND Corporation, founded as a research corporation. Did groundbreaking work in the field of artificial intelligence
The Jet Propulsion Laboratory, founded by Theodore von Kármán
Bell Laboratories, renowned for the quality of its scientific work and for inventing the operating system Unix, and the programming languages C and C++
Xerox PARC, research organization which has also spawned innovations such as the graphical user interface, laser printing, and Ethernet
SRI, where the computer mouse was invented, were explicitly founded with a research basis
IBM Research, notable for inventing the relational database, hard disk drive, and floppy disk
Hughes Research Laboratories, location of the invention of the first working laser
The Howard Hughes Medical Institute, non-profit medical research organization

See also
Science of science policy (SoSP)

References
Gerald Holton, Einstein, History, and Other Passions
John Ziman, Reliable Knowledge

Heuristics
Scientific method
Technological races